Thomas Sexton (born 19 November 1998) is a New Zealand racing cyclist currently racing for UCI ProTeam . He rode in the men's scratch event at the 2018 UCI Track Cycling World Championships.

Major results

Track

2015
 3rd  Madison, Oceania Track Championships
2016
 UCI Junior Track World Championships
1st  Team pursuit
2nd  Madison
 Oceania Track Championships
2nd  Team pursuit
3rd  Madison
 UCI World Cup
3rd  Scratch, Los Angeles
3rd  Madison, Los Angeles (with Campbell Stewart)
2017
 1st  Madison, Oceania Track Championships (with Campbell Stewart)
 National Track Championships
1st  Team pursuit
2nd Madison
 UCI World Cup
1st  Team pursuit, Milton
1st  Team pursuit, Santiago
1st  Madison, Santiago (with Campbell Stewart)
2nd  Madison, Milton (with Campbell Stewart)
2018
 Oceania Track Championships
1st  Team pursuit
2nd  Madison
 UCI World Cup
1st  Team pursuit, Cambridge
1st  Madison, Hong Kong (with Campbell Stewart)
2019
 National Track Championships
1st  Team pursuit
3rd Points race
 UCI World Cup
2nd  Team pursuit, Hong Kong
2nd  Team pursuit, Brisbane
2nd  Madison, Hong Kong (with Campbell Stewart)
2nd  Madison, Brisbane (with Aaron Gate)
 3rd  Scratch, UCI Track World Championships
2020
 1st  Madison, National Track Championships (with Laurence Pithie)
2021
 National Track Championships
1st  Madison (with Regan Gough)
1st  Team pursuit
2022
 Commonwealth Games
1st  Team pursuit
2nd  Individual pursuit
 1st  Individual pursuit, National Track Championships
 Oceania Track Championships
2nd  Madison
2nd  Points race
2nd  Team pursuit

Road
2020
 1st Prologue (TTT) Tour of Southland
2021
 1st Prologue (TTT) Tour of Southland
2022
 Oceania Road Championships
2nd  Road race
2nd  Time trial
 National Road Championships
2nd Road race
3rd Time trial
 9th Time trial, Commonwealth Games

References

External links

1998 births
Living people
New Zealand male cyclists
New Zealand track cyclists
Cyclists from Invercargill
Cyclists at the 2018 Commonwealth Games
Commonwealth Games competitors for New Zealand
Cyclists at the 2022 Commonwealth Games
Commonwealth Games gold medallists for New Zealand
Commonwealth Games medallists in cycling
21st-century New Zealand people
Commonwealth Games silver medallists for New Zealand
Medallists at the 2022 Commonwealth Games